Richmal Crompton Lamburn (15 November 1890 – 11 January 1969) was a popular English writer, best known for her Just William series of books, humorous short stories, and to a lesser extent adult fiction books.

Life
Richmal Crompton Lamburn  was born in Bury, Lancashire, the second child of the Rev. Edward John Sewell Lamburn, a Classics master at Bury Grammar School and his wife Clara (née Crompton). Her brother, John Battersby Crompton Lamburn, also became a writer, remembered under the name John Lambourne for his fantasy novel The Kingdom That Was (1931) and under the name "John Crompton" for his books on natural history.

Richmal Crompton attended St Elphin's Boarding School for the daughters of the clergy, originally based in Warrington, Lancashire. She later moved with the school to a new location in Darley Dale, near Matlock, Derbyshire in 1904. In order to further her chosen career as a schoolteacher, she won a scholarship to Royal Holloway College, part of the University of London in Englefield Green, Surrey. Crompton graduated in 1914 with a BA honours degree in Classics (II class). She took part in the Women's Suffrage movement.

In 1914, she returned to St Elphin's as a Classics mistress and later, at age 27, moved to Bromley High School in southeast London where she began her writing in earnest. Cadogan (1993) shows that she was an excellent and committed teacher at both schools. Having contracted poliomyelitis in 1923  she was left without the use of her right leg. She gave up her teaching career and began to write full-time.

She never married and had no children; she was an aunt and a great-aunt. Her William stories and her other literature were extremely successful and, three years after she retired from teaching, Crompton was able to afford to have a house (The Glebe) built in Bromley Common for herself and her mother, Clara.

Crompton died in 1969 at the age of 78, after a heart attack, in Farnborough Hospital.

Crompton left the copyright of all her books to her niece, Mrs Richmal C. L. Ashbee of Chelsfield, Kent; along with £57,623.

Work

Crompton's best known books are the William stories, about a mischievous 11-year-old schoolboy and his band of friends, known as "The Outlaws". Her first published short story featuring William was "Rice Mould Pudding", published in Home Magazine in 1919. (She had written "The Outlaws" in 1917, but it was not published until later.) In 1922, the first collection, entitled  Just William, was published. She wrote 38 other William books throughout her life. The last, William the Lawless, was published posthumously in 1970.

The William books sold over 12 million copies in the United Kingdom alone. They have been adapted for films, stage-plays, and numerous radio and television series. Illustrations by Thomas Henry contributed to their success.

Crompton saw her real work as writing adult fiction. Starting with The Innermost Room (1923), she wrote 41 novels for adults and published nine collections of short stories. Their focus was generally village life in the Home Counties. Though these novels have the same inventiveness and lack of sentimentality as the 'William' books, after the Second World War, such literature had an increasingly limited appeal.

Even William was originally created for a grown-up audience, as she saw Just William as a potboiler (Cadogan, 1993). She was pleased by its success, but seemed frustrated that her other novels and short stories did not receive the same recognition. Her first published story was published in The Girl's Own Paper in 1918, concerning a little boy named Thomas, a forerunner of William who reacts against authority. Crompton tried several times to reformulate William for other audiences. Jimmy (1949) was aimed at younger children, and Enter – Patricia (1927) at girls. Crompton wrote two more Jimmy books, but no more Patricia, and neither was as successful as William.

Crompton never disclosed the source of inspiration for the main character William; different opinions exist. Presumably it was the result of mixing observations of children she worked with or knew with her own imagination. According to the actor John Teed, whose family lived next door to Crompton, the model for William was Crompton's nephew Tommy:
As a boy I knew Miss Richmal Crompton Lamburn well. She lived quietly with her mother in Cherry Orchard Road, Bromley Common. My family lived next door. In those days it was a small rural village. Miss Lamburn was a delightful unassuming young woman and I used to play with her young nephew Tommy. He used to get up to all sorts of tricks and he was always presumed to be the inspiration for William by all of us. Having contracted polio she was severely crippled and confined to a wheelchair. Owing to her restricted movements she took her setting from her immediate surroundings which contained many of the features described, such as unspoilt woods and wide streams and Biggin Hill Aerodrome, very active in the Twenties.

Crompton's fiction centres around family and social life, dwelling on the constraints that they place on individuals while also nurturing them. This is best seen in her depiction of children as puzzled onlookers of society's ways. Nevertheless, the children, particularly William and his Outlaws, almost always emerge triumphant.

The William books have been translated into sixteen or seventeen languages (Cadogan, 1993).

List of published works
The publication dates are for the UK.

Just William short story collections

 Just William, 1922 
 More William, 1922
 William Again, 1923
 William the Fourth, 1924
 Still William, 1925
 William The Conqueror, 1926
 William the Outlaw, 1927
 William in Trouble, 1927
 William the Good, 1928
 William, 1929
 William the Bad, 1930
 William's Happy Days, 1930
 William's Crowded Hours, 1931
 William the Pirate, 1932
 William the Rebel, 1933
 William the Gangster, 1934
 William the Detective, 1935
 Sweet William, 1936
 William the Showman, 1937
 William the Dictator, 1938
 William and A.R.P., 1939 (also published as William's Bad Resolution, 1956)
 William and the Evacuees, 1940 (also published as William and the Film Star, 1956)
 William Does His Bit, 1941 
 William Carries On, 1942
 William and The Brains Trust, 1945
 Just William's Luck, 1948
 William the Bold, 1950
 William and the Tramp, 1952
 William and the Moon Rocket, 1954
 William and the Artist's Model, 1956
 William and the Space Animal, 1956
 William's Television Show, 1958
 William the Explorer, 1960
 William's Treasure Trove, 1962
 William and the Witch, 1964
 William and the Pop Singers, 1965
 William and the Masked Ranger, 1966
 William the Superman, 1968
 William the Lawless, 1970

Just William plays

 William and the Artist's Model, 1956
 William the Terrible, BBC Radio Plays volume 1, 2008, published by David Schutte
 William the Lionheart, BBC Radio Plays volume 2, 2008, published by David Schutte
 William the Peacemaker, BBC Radio Plays volume 3, 2009, published by David Schutte
 William the Avenger, BBC Radio Plays volume 4, 2009, published by David Schutte
 William the Smuggler, BBC Radio Plays volume 5, 2010, published by David Schutte
 William's Secret Society, BBC Radio Plays volume 6, 2010, published by David Schutte

William-like books
 Enter – Patricia, 1927
 Jimmy, 1949
 Jimmy Again, 1951
 Jimmy the Third, a compilation of stories from Jimmy and Jimmy Again, 1965

Others

 The Innermost Room, 1923
 The Hidden Light, 1924
 Anne Morrison, 1925
 The Wildings, 1925
 David Wilding, 1926
 The House, 1926 (also published as Dread Dwelling)
 Kathleen and I, and, of Course, Veronica, 1926 (short stories)
 Millicent Dorrington, 1927
 A Monstrous Regiment, 1927 (short stories)
 Leadon Hill, 1927
 The Thorn Bush, 1928
 Roofs Off!, 1928
 The Middle Things, 1928 (short stories)
 Felicity Stands By, 1928 (short stories)
 Sugar and Spice and Other Stories, 1928 (short stories)
 Mist and Other Stories, 1928 (short stories), republished in May 2015 by Sundial Press as "MIST And Other Ghost Stories"
 The Four Graces, 1929
 Abbot's End, 1929
 Ladies First, 1929 (short stories)
 Blue Flames, 1930
 Naomi Godstone, 1930
 The Silver Birch and Other Stories, 1931 (short stories)
 Portrait of a Family, 1931
 The Odyssey of Euphemia Tracy, 1932
 Marriage of Hermione, 1932
 The Holiday, 1933
 Chedsy Place, 1934
 The Old Man's Birthday, 1934
 Quartet, 1935
 Caroline, 1936
 The First Morning, 1936 (short stories)
 There Are Four Seasons, 1937
 Journeying Wave, 1938
 Merlin Bay, 1939
 Steffan Green, 1940
 Narcissa, 1941
 Mrs Frensham Describes a Circle, 1942
 Weatherly Parade, 1944
 Westover, 1946
 The Ridleys, 1947
 Family Roundabout, 1948, republished in 2001 by Persephone Books
 Frost at Morning, 1950
 Linden Rise, 1952
 The Gypsy's Baby, 1954
 Four in Exile, 1954
 Matty and the Dearingroydes, 1956
 Blind Man's Buff, 1957
 Wiseman's Folly, 1959
 The Inheritor, 1960
 ‘’The House in the Wood - and other stories’’, 2022

Other Short Stories
Half-an-Hour. Adelaide Observer, 23 December 1922

Legacy
Richmal Crompton's archives are held at Roehampton University, London and at Wat Tyler Country Park, Pitsea, where some members of her family lived. A public house in Bromley is named in her honour and contains framed prints and texts from the William series.

The novel and TV series Good Omens by Neil Gaiman and Terry Pratchett was inspired by Just William, with the premise being the Antichrist in the place of William, and his gang ("The Them") in place of "The Outlaws". The initial working title for the novel was "William the Antichrist". Another of Pratchett's works, the Johnny Maxwell series, was also inspired by Just William, Pratchett stating that it was based very loosely on an idea of what Just William would be like in a 1990s setting.

References

Sources and further reading

 Jane McVeigh: Richmal Crompton, author of Just William : a literary life, Cham : Springer International Publishing, 2022, 
Manchester Authors, Writers and Poets Page at the Papillon Graphics' Virtual Encyclopaedia of Greater Manchester.
Biography at Just William website.

External links 

 
 
 
 
 

1890 births
1969 deaths
20th-century British short story writers
20th-century English novelists
20th-century English women writers
Alumni of Royal Holloway, University of London
English children's writers
English short story writers
English women novelists
Just William
People associated with the University of Roehampton
People from the Borough of Basildon
People from Bury, Greater Manchester
People from Chislehurst
People with polio